Blackband is an unincorporated community in Tuscarawas County, in the U.S. state of Ohio.

History
Blackband had its start when the railroad was extended to that point. A post office called Blackband was established in 1873.

References

Unincorporated communities in Tuscarawas County, Ohio
Unincorporated communities in Ohio